The German Motor Sport Federation ( or DMSB, formerly known as  or ONS) is Germany's motor racing governing body. It represents Germany at FIA and FIM.

Member clubs
 ADAC
 Automobilclub von Deutschland (AvD)
 Deutscher Motorsport Verband (DMV)

Racing series organized by DMSB
 F3 Euroseries
 FIA European Formula Three Championship
 ATS Formel 3 Cup
 Deutsche Motorrad-Straßenmeisterschaft

ITR e.V.
 Deutsche Tourenwagen Masters (until 2022)

Motorsport Team Germany 
The Motorsport Team Germany is a squad containing young up-and-coming German talents in car racing, rallying and motorcycling.

Current members

References

External links
 

Motorsport in Germany
Speedway in Germany
National sporting authorities of the FIA